The Wolf of Wall Street is a 2013 American biographical black comedy film directed by Martin Scorsese. The screenplay was adapted by Terence Winter from Jordan Belfort's memoir of the same name. The film stars Leonardo DiCaprio as Belfort, a New York stockbroker who runs a firm that engages in securities fraud and money laundering on Wall Street in the 1990s. Jonah Hill, Margot Robbie, and Kyle Chandler feature in supporting roles.
The film premiered in New York City on December 17, 2013. Paramount Pictures gave it a wide release in North America and France on December 25. The film grossed a worldwide total of over $392 million on a production budget of $100 million. As of August 2015, it is Scorsese's highest-grossing film. Rotten Tomatoes, a review aggregator, surveyed 276 reviews and judged 79% to be positive.

The Wolf of Wall Street garnered awards and nominations in a variety of categories with particular praise for Scorsese's direction, DiCaprio's performance as Belfort, and Winter's adapted screenplay. At the 86th Academy Awards, the film was nominated for five Academy Awards: Best Picture, Best Director for Scorsese, Best Adapted Screenplay for Winter, Best Actor for DiCaprio, and Best Supporting Actor for Hill but failed to win in any category. The Wolf of Wall Street earned four nominations at the 67th British Academy Film Awards (BAFTAs), including Best Director, Best Actor, and Best Adapted Screenplay but did not win in any category. The film received two nominations at the 71st Golden Globe Awards, including Best Motion Picture – Musical or Comedy with DiCaprio winning the Golden Globe Award for Best Actor – Motion Picture Musical or Comedy. The film was also nominated at the 66th Directors Guild of America Awards, the 25th Producers Guild of America Awards, and the 66th Writers Guild of America Awards. Both the National Board of Review and the American Film Institute included The Wolf of Wall Street in their respective lists of top ten films of 2013.

Accolades

See also 

2013 in film

Notes

References

External links 
 

Lists of accolades by film